Borova Raion was a raion (district) in Kharkiv Oblast of Ukraine. Its administrative center was the urban-type settlement of Borova, Kharkiv Oblast. The raion was abolished on 18 July 2020 as part of the administrative reform of Ukraine, which reduced the number of raions of Kharkiv Oblast to seven. The area of Borova Raion was merged into Izium Raion. The last estimate of the raion population was

Subdivisions
At the time of disestablishment, the raion consisted of one hromada, Borova settlement hromada with the administration in Borova.

Geography 
The main rivers of the raion were the Oskil River and 8 more rivers. Borova Raion bordered with Kupiansk Raion in the north, with Svatove and Kreminna Raions of Luhansk Oblast in the east, Lyman Raion, Donetsk Oblast in the south, and Izium Raion in the west.

Localities 
 Zelenyi Hai

References 

Former raions of Kharkiv Oblast
1923 establishments in Ukraine
Ukrainian raions abolished during the 2020 administrative reform